White City was a railway station on the Sunbury railway line (then the St Albans line) of the Melbourne suburban rail system in Melbourne, Australia. It was located approximately 700 metres west of Tottenham railway station. The next station down the line was Sunshine.

History

The station was opened on 10 December 1927, to serve the new White City greyhound racing track, named after the site of the 1908 London Olympics. The station was originally called Coursing Platform and was renamed White City on 25 August 1929.

Workmen's trains from the city began stopping at the station on 10 June 1940, serving employees at local industries, such as the Olympic Tyres factory, but it was not until 28 June 1948, that trains returning to the city stopped at the station, when an afternoon "up" service was provided from the station's single platform, using the crossover at the up end of the platform. White City was made a regular suburban station in December 1949. The station only ever had one platform, on the westbound track, even though fifty services a week stopped there at its peak. Due to its proximity to Tottenham station, White City's signals were operated from there.

In the early 1980s, Tottenham station and its area underwent extensive alterations. The line was raised in order to eliminate the level crossing at Ashley Street, and a new high-level island platform was provided. As a consequence, it was decided to remove the nearby White City station. On 4 October 1981, White City was officially closed. It was later demolished, and no trace of its existence remains.

References

References
Victorian Railways signal diagram: West Footscray to Sunshine (1977)

Disused railway stations in Melbourne
Railway stations in Australia opened in 1927
Railway stations closed in 1981